The following is a Mackerras pendulum for the 1992 Victorian state election.

"Very safe" seats require a swing of over 20 per cent to change, "safe" seats require a swing of 10 to 20 per cent to change, "fairly safe" seats require a swing of between 6 and 10 per cent, while "marginal" seats require a swing of less than 6 per cent.

Notes
 On 28 June 1993, the Labor member for Broadmeadows, Jim Kennan, resigned. Labor candidate John Brumby won the resulting by-election on 18 September 1993. No two-party count was performed for the by-election.
 In March 1994, the Labor member for Coburg, Tom Roper, resigned. Labor candidate Carlo Carli won the resulting by-election on 14 May 1994.
 On 27 May 1994, the Labor member for Williamstown and former Premier of Victoria, Joan Kirner, resigned. Labor candidate Steve Bracks won the resulting by-election on 13 August 1994.
 Bob Sercombe and Kelvin Thomson, respectively the Labor members for Niddrie and Pascoe Vale, resigned in February 1996 to contest seats at the 1996 federal election. Rob Hulls was elected unopposed to Niddrie at the close of nominations on 29 February 1996. Two nominations were received for Pascoe Vale by 29 February for a March 30 by-election, but the by-election was cancelled when the state election was called for the same day.

References

 
 

Pendulums for Victorian state elections